Government Aizawl West College is an educational institution located in Dawrpui Vengthar, Aizawl, Mizoram. It is currently affiliated with Mizoram University.

History

Government Aizawl West College was founded on 2 May 1990 with 7 teachers and 150 students with the primary objective of imparting college education in the evening hours for deserving students especially to the students who could not afford education in day college. When the government upgraded Aizawl College to the status of government aided college in 1989, it became a day college and hence the need of another evening college. While there were colleges in the eastern, southern and northern part of Aizawl city, there was not a single college in the western part of Aizawl. Thus considering the need of those students for pursuing their higher education,  a new college was opened in the western part with land donated by the residents of the locality of Dawrpui Vengthar, Aizawl.

The college was first affiliated to the North-Eastern Hill University (NEHU) for pre-university (arts) on 9 March 1992, and degree (arts) on 9 June 1994. When Mizoram University was established on 2 July 2002 the affiliation was transferred to the new university.

Facilities
The college currently has 700 students and 38 teachers.

Departments
Department of English
Department of Mizo
Department of Public Administration
Department of Psychology
Department of History
Department of Education
Department of Political Science
Department of Economics

See also
Education in India
Education in Mizoram
Mizoram University
Literacy in India

References

External links
 

Universities and colleges in Mizoram
Colleges affiliated to Mizoram University
Education in Aizawl